Serbian genocide may refer to several different events:

 Genocide of Serbs, Ustashe genocide against Serbs during World War II 

 Bosnian genocide, Army of Republika Srpska genocide against Bosniaks during the 1992–1995 Bosnian War

See also
 Croatia–Serbia genocide case, a 1999–2015 suit before the International Court of Justice